SoccerGrow is a soccer charity aimed at supporting the international soccer community, specifically lower-income regions. SoccerGrow was started in June 2008 by the founders of the soccer retailer SoccerPro, with the intention of getting its customer base involved with soccer charity work. SoccerGrow works with other charities, such as Kicks for Kenya, by donating soccer products to them to distribute.

Purpose statement

References

External links
 SoccerGrow.org
 SoccerPro.com

Charities based in Missouri
Sports organizations of the United States
Soccer in Missouri
Sports charities
Organizations based in Columbia, Missouri